A Cage of Nightingales (French: La Cage aux rossignols) is a 1945 French film directed by Jean Dréville. It was nominated for the Academy Award for Best Story, and served as an inspiration for the film The Chorus (2004).

Synopsis
Clement Mathieu seeks to publish his novel without success. With the help of a friend who is a journalist, his story about the 'Cage of Nightingales' is slipped surreptitiously into a newspaper...

In France, in the 1930s, a supervisor at a rehabilitation house awakens difficult teens' inner musical tendencies by forming a choir, despite the director's skepticism. Later, this experience is reported in a novel in a major newspaper.

The history of the Cage of Nightingales' is directly inspired by that of an actual educational centre, called Ker Goat, where Jacques Dietz, Roger Riffier and their teams worked to help children in difficulty through choral singing and innovative teaching methods.

Cast

Noël-Noël as Clément Mathieu
Micheline Francey as Micheline
Georges Biscot as Raymond
René Génin as Le père Maxence
René Blancard as Monsieur Rachin
Marguerite Ducouret as La mère de Micheline
Marcelle Praince as La présidente
Marthe Mellot as Marie
Georges Paulais as Monsieur Langlois
André Nicolle as Monsieur de la Frade
Richard Francoeur as Monsieur de Mézères
Jean Morel as Le directeur
Roger Vincent as L'académicien
Michel François as Lequerec
Roger Krebsl as Laugier
Choir - Les Petits Chanteurs à la Croix de Bois

Reception
The film was the second most popular movie at the French box office in 1945.  A highly regarded adaptation of the film, under the title Les Choristes (English title: The Chorus) came out in 2004, and starred the French actor Gérard Jugnot.  It was directed by Christophe Barratier.

References

External links

1940s French-language films
1945 films
Films directed by Jean Dréville
Films about educators
French black-and-white films
French musical drama films
1940s musical drama films
1945 drama films
1940s French films